Arbaciella elegans is a species of sea urchin of the family Arbaciidae. Their armour is covered with spines. It is placed in the genus Arbacia and lives in the sea. Arbaciella elegans was first scientifically described in 1910 by Ole Theodor Jensen Mortensen.

See also 
 Arbacia spatuligera
 Arbacia stellata
 Argopatagus planus

References 

Arbacioida
Animals described in 1910
Taxa named by Ole Theodor Jensen Mortensen